Greg McGrath (born 21 January 1997) is an Irish rugby union player from Wexford, currently playing for Pro14 and European Rugby Champions Cup side Connacht. He previously played for Leinster. His preferred position is tighthead  prop.

Leinster
McGrath was named in the Leinster side for Round 10 of the 2020–21 Pro14 against . He made his debut in the same match, coming on as a replacement.

References

External links
itsrugby.co.uk Profile

1997 births
Living people
Irish rugby union players
Leinster Rugby players
Rugby union props
Connacht Rugby players
Irish expatriate sportspeople in Jersey
Jersey Reds players
Irish expatriate rugby union players
Expatriate rugby union players in Jersey